Gremyachaya is a rural locality (a settlement) in Kotelnikovsky District, Volgograd Oblast, Russia. The population was 31 as of 2010.

Geography 
Gremyachaya is located 22 km northeast of Kotelnikovo (the district's administrative centre) by road. Pimeno-Cherni is the nearest rural locality.

References 

Rural localities in Kotelnikovsky District